Gesenius is a surname. Notable people with the surname include:

Justus Gesenius (1601–1673), German theologian
Heinrich Friedrich Wilhelm Gesenius (1786–1842), German orientalist, Biblical critic, theologian and Hebraist, famous for his Hebrew grammar text and his Biblical Hebrew lexicon
Gesenius' Lexicon
Gesenius-Kautzsch-Cowley